Lovetown or Love Town may refer to

 Lovetown (album), a 1988 album by Stephen Cummings
 "Love Town", a 1983 single by Booker Newberry III
 "Lovetown", a 1994 single by Peter Gabriel included in the sound-track of the film Philadelphia
 "Lovetown", a song by Sneaky Sound System from their 2011 album From Here to Anywhere
 Lovetown Tour, a 1989/1990 tour by Irish rock band U2
 Lovetown, USA, a 2012/13 American reality documentary television series

See also
 Love Township, Vermilion County, Illinois
 "Love This Town"
 Lovetone